The enzyme D-serine ammonia-lyase (EC 4.3.1.18), with systematic name D-serine ammonia-lyase (pyruvate-forming), catalyzes the chemical reaction

D-serine = pyruvate + NH3 (overall reaction)
(1a) D-serine = 2-aminoprop-2-enoate + H2O
(1b) 2-aminoprop-2-enoate = 2-iminopropanoate (spontaneous)
(1c) 2-iminopropanoate + H2O = pyruvate + NH3 (spontaneous

Other names in common use include D-hydroxyaminoacid dehydratase, D-serine dehydrase, D-hydroxy amino acid dehydratase, D-serine hydrolase, D-serine dehydratase (deaminating), D-serine deaminase, and D-serine hydro-lyase (deaminating).  This enzyme participates in glycine, serine and threonine metabolism.  It employs one cofactor, pyridoxal phosphate.

References

 
 

EC 4.3.1
Pyridoxal phosphate enzymes
Enzymes of unknown structure